The 2016 Gateshead Metropolitan Borough Council election took place on 5 May 2016 to elect members of Gateshead Metropolitan Borough Council in England. This was on the same day as other local elections.

Results

References

2016 English local elections
2016
21st century in Tyne and Wear